Brook Farm overlooks Skaneateles Lake and was built in 1902.  It was listed on the National Register of Historic Places in 2003.

It includes Colonial Revival style architecture.

References

Houses on the National Register of Historic Places in New York (state)
Colonial Revival architecture in New York (state)
Houses completed in 1902
Houses in Onondaga County, New York
National Register of Historic Places in Onondaga County, New York